Christian Vázquez, Christian Vásquez, or variants thereof may refer to:

 Christian Vasquez (born 1977), Filipino actor and model
 Christian Vásquez (born 1984), Venezuelan conductor and violinist
 Christian Vásquez (footballer) (born 2001), Peruvian footballer
 Christian Vázquez (born 1990), Puerto Rican baseball catcher
 Christian Vázquez (actor) (born c. 1986), Mexican actor
 Cristian Vázquez (born 1998), Argentine footballer

See also
 Vasquez